The Cypseloidinae are a subfamily of swifts and contain the following species:

 Genus Cypseloides
 Spot-fronted swift (Cypseloides cherriei)
 White-chinned swift (Cypseloides cryptus)
 Sooty swift (Cypseloides fumigatus)
 White-chested swift (Cypseloides lemosi)
 Rothschild's swift (Cypseloides rothschildi)
 Great dusky swift (Cypseloides senex)
 White-fronted swift (Cypseloides storeri)
 American black swift (Cypseloides niger)
 Subspecies: C. n. borealis, C. n. costaricensis, & C. n. niger
 Genus Streptoprocne
 Biscutate swift (Streptoprocne biscutata)
 Subspecies: S. b. seridoensis, & S. b. biscutata
 Tepui swift (Streptoprocne phelpsi)
 White-naped swift (Streptoprocne semicollaris)
 White-collared swift (Streptoprocne zonaris)
 Subspecies: S. z. mexicana, S. z. bouchellii, S. z. pallidifrons, S. z. minor,  S. z. albicincta, S. z. subtropicalis, S. z. altissima, S. z. kuenzeli, & S. z. zonaris
 Chestnut-collared swift (Streptoprocne rutila)
 Subspecies: S. r. griseifrons, S. r. brunnitorques. & S. r. rutila

References

External links

Apodidae
Bird subfamilies
Taxa named by Charles Lucien Bonaparte